Dorsum atlas is a moth of the family Erebidae first described by Michael Fibiger in 2011. It is found in India's Khasi Hills.

The wingspan is about 17 mm. The head, patagia, anterior part of tegulae and prothorax are blackish brown, while the rest of the thorax and tegulae is beige. The forewings are beige, suffused with light-brown scales. The basal part of the costa, costal part of the triangular medial area and the terminal area (including fringes) are blackish grey. The crosslines are indistinct and beige. The terminal line is indicated by black interveinal dots. The hindwing ground colour is light grey with a distinct discal spot. The abdomen is beige.

References

Micronoctuini
Moths described in 2011
Taxa named by Michael Fibiger